Alex da Silva (born 15 May 1994), known as Alex Silva, is a Brazilian footballer who plays as a right-back for Vila Nova.

Club career
Born in Nanuque, Minas Gerais, Alex Silva joined Atlético Mineiro's youth setup in January 2013. On 20 October he made his first team – and Série A – debut, playing the last 12 minutes in a 1–0 home win against Flamengo.

On 22 January 2014 Alex Silva was definitely promoted to the main squad by manager Paulo Autuori. He renewed his link with Galo on 10 March, running until 2017, and appeared in 40 matches during the campaign (22 in the league).

Alex Silva subsequently had unassuming loan spells at Sport Recife, Ferroviária and América Mineiro before returning t Galo in May 2017, acting as a backup to Marcos Rocha. On 19 January 2018, he joined Goiás also in a temporary deal, and helped the club achieve promotion to the top tier.

On 10 January 2019, Alex Silva was presented at Avaí, after agreeing to a season-long loan deal.

Honours
Atlético Mineiro
Recopa Sudamericana: 2014
Copa do Brasil: 2014

Goiás
Campeonato Goiano: 2018

Avaí
Campeonato Catarinense: 2019

References

External links
Atlético official profile 

1994 births
Living people
Sportspeople from Minas Gerais
Brazilian footballers
Association football defenders
Campeonato Brasileiro Série A players
Campeonato Brasileiro Série B players
Clube Atlético Mineiro players
Sport Club do Recife players
Associação Ferroviária de Esportes players
América Futebol Clube (MG) players
Goiás Esporte Clube players
Avaí FC players
Coimbra Esporte Clube players
Operário Ferroviário Esporte Clube players
Esporte Clube Água Santa players
Vila Nova Futebol Clube players